"Love You on Christmas" is the second digital single by South Korean singer Yerin Baek. It was released digitally by JYP Entertainment on December 7, 2016 and distributed by KT Music.

Background and composition
Yerin announced would be releasing her holiday single titled Love You on Christmas on November 7. Yerin released album spoiler for lead single Love You on Christmas and B-side English single November song on November 6. The single was written and composed by Yerin.

Track listing

References

2016 singles
Christmas albums by South Korean artists
JYP Entertainment singles
Korean-language songs
2016 songs